<onlyinclude>

This is a list of encyclicals of Pope Pius XII. Pius XII promulgated 41 papal encyclicals, during his reign as pope for over 19 years, from his election of March 2, 1939, until his death on October 9, 1958. The 41 encyclicals of Pius XII exceed the 32 encyclicals written by all his successors (John XXIII, Paul VI, John Paul I, John Paul II, and Benedict XVI) during the fifty years that followed (1958–2008).

The encyclicals of Pius XII

Background 
An encyclical (from Latin encyclia, from the Greek "en kyklo, ", meaning "general" or "encircling") was a circular letter sent to all the churches of a particular area in the ancient Christian church.  For the modern Roman Catholic Church, a Papal Encyclical, in the strictest sense, is a letter sent by the pope which is explicitly addressed to Roman Catholic bishops of a particular area or to the world, usually treating some aspect of Catholic doctrine.  A Papal Encyclical is generally used for significant issues, and is second in importance only to the highest-ranking document now issued by popes, an Apostolic Constitution. 

The title of a Papal Encyclical is usually taken from its first few words.

View of Pope Pius XII 

Pope Pius XII held that papal encyclicals, even when they are not ex cathedra, can nonetheless be sufficiently authoritative to end theological debate on a particular question. He wrote in Humani generis:

The use of encyclicals by Pius XII 

Encyclicals indicate high Papal priority for an issue at a given time.  Only pontiffs define when, and  under which circumstances encyclicals should be issued. They may choose to issue  an apostolic constitution, bull, encyclical, apostolic letter or give a papal speech. Pontiffs differ on the use of encyclicals. On the issue of birth control and contraception, for example, Pope Pius XI issued the encyclical Casti connubii, while Pope Pius XII spoke to midwives and the medical profession when he clarified his position on the issue. Pope Paul VI published an encyclical Humanae vitae on the same topic. On matters of war and peace, Pope Pius XII issued ten encyclicals, most of them after 1945, three of them (Datis nuperrime,  Sertum laetitiae, and Luctuosissimi eventus) protesting the Soviet invasion and crackdown of the Hungarian revolution in 1956. Pope Paul VI spoke about the war in Vietnam and Pope John Paul II, issued his protest against the war in Iraq in speeches. On social issues, Pope Leo XIII promulgated Rerum novarum, followed by Quadragesimo anno by Pius XI, and Centesimus annus by John Paul II. Pius XII spoke on the same topic to a consistory of cardinals in his Christmas messages and to numerous academic and professional associations. The magisterium of Pius XII is therefore significantly larger than the below listed 41 encyclicals. Most of the  detailed teachings are in his papal speeches on specific topics such as:

 Conscience, guilt and fair punishment,
 Ethics of psychological research,
 Farmers,
 Fashion Industry,
 Formation of conscience,
 Genetic research,
 Human dignity,
 Medical doctors and the use of weapons,
 Military medical research,

References

External links
Pope Pius XII Encyclicals (most in English, Italian, Portuguese with some in French, Italian, Spanish and one in German) - from the Papal Archive at the internet site of the Holy See.
PapalEncyclicals.net - Pope Pius XII - online copies

Pius 12